Parnay is a commune in the Maine-et-Loire department in western France. It is known for its 11th Century Church. Parnay is one of the nine communes that is in the AOC Saumur-Champigny and fruit Red Wine made from Cabernet Franc.

See also
Communes of the Maine-et-Loire department

References

Communes of Maine-et-Loire